Sunrisers Hyderabad (SRH) are a franchise cricket team based in Hyderabad, Telangana, India, which plays in the Indian Premier League (IPL). They were one of the eight teams to compete in the 2019 Indian Premier League, making their seventh outing in all the IPL tournaments. The team was captained by Kane Williamson and coached by Tom Moody with Simon Helmot as assistant coach, Muttiah Muralitharan as bowling coach and V. V. S. Laxman as mentor.

Background
The 2019 Indian Premier League began on 23 March 2019. The venue of tournament had been the subject of speculation during the players' auction due to the clash of dates with the Indian general elections and the initial news reports suggested that the tournament could be held outside India with South Africa and United Arab Emirates as the potential replacements. However, on 8 January 2019, the Board for Control of Cricket in India (BCCI) confirmed that the tournament would take place entirely in India though the schedule is yet to be decided. As per the BCCI press release, the full schedule was expected to be released in February and suggested that they might consider the change of venues if needed once the election dates were announced.

Player acquisition

The Sunrisers Hyderabad traded Shikhar Dhawan and paid  in cash to the Delhi Daredevils in exchange for three players – Vijay Shankar, Abhishek Sharma and Shahbaz Nadeem during the IPL trading window before the auction. Dhawan was associated with the Sunrisers since their inception in 2013 and the reason for the Sunrisers to trade their most successful batsmen was widely reported as Dhawan's unhappiness over the financial reasons. The Sunrisers retained 17 players and released eight players as they announced their retention list on 15 November ahead of the auction.

The BCCI announced on 3 December that the 2019 IPL players' auction was scheduled to be held on 18 December at Jaipur. The auction for the Sunrisers were a quiet affair with most of the slots already filled before the auction.

Retained: Basil Thampi, Bhuvneshwar Kumar, Deepak Hooda, Manish Pandey, Thangarasu Natarajan, Ricky Bhui, Sandeep Sharma, Siddarth Kaul, Shreevats Goswami, Khaleel Ahmed, Yusuf Pathan, Billy Stanlake, David Warner, Kane Williamson, Rashid Khan, Mohammad Nabi, Shakib Al Hasan

Released: Sachin Baby, Tanmay Agarwal, Wriddhiman Saha, Chris Jordan, Carlos Brathwaite, Alex Hales, Bipul Sharma, Mehdi Hasan

Traded In: Abhishek Sharma, Vijay Shankar, Shahbaz Nadeem

Traded Out: Shikhar Dhawan

Added: Jonny Bairstow, Wriddhiman Saha, Martin Guptill

Squad 
 Players with international caps are listed in bold.
 Signed Year denotes year from which player is continuously associated with Sunrisers Hyderabad

Administration and support staff

Kit manufacturers and sponsors

Indian Premier League

Offseason
The schedule for the first two weeks of this season were released on 18 February with the Sunrisers Hyderabad playing their first match against the Kolkata Knight Riders on 24 March in an away game at Kolkata while they played their first home match against the Rajasthan Royals on 29 March. The Board of Control for Cricket in India (BCCI) released the schedule for the remaining fixtures of the league stage on 19 March following the release of the Indian general election schedule.

David Warner came back into the squad following the completion of a season ban imposed on him by the BCCI due to his involvement in a ball-tampering scandal. Despite the return of Warner, the Sunrisers' coach Tom Moody announced that Kane Williamson would continue to lead the side during the IPL 2019.

Speaking about Sunrisers' squad available this season and Williamson's captaincy record, coach Moody said,

Season overview

League stage
Standings

Results by match

Playoff stage

Fixtures

League stage

Playoff stage

Eliminator

Statistics

IPL Statistics Full Table on Cricinfo

Awards and achievements

Awards
 Man of the Match

Season awards
 Winner of the Orange Cap : David Warner
 Winner of 2019 Fair Play Award

Achievements
 Sunrisers recorded their highest successful run chase in the IPL (201/5) in a match against the Rajasthan Royals.
 Warner and Bairstow scored centuries in the same match and recorded the highest ever first wicket partnership in the IPL (185) while Sunrisers achieved their highest total in the IPL (231/2) in a match against the Royal Challengers Bangalore.
 Most half-centuries scored in the 2019 IPL : David Warner (8)
 Most centuries scored in the 2019 IPL : Jonny Bairstow & David Warner (1)
 Fastest century scored in the 2019 IPL : Jonny Bairstow (52 balls)
 Highest Individual score in the 2019 IPL : Jonny Bairstow (114)
 Best bowling strike rate in the 2019 IPL : Khaleel Ahmed (11.00)

Reaction
David Warner was featured in the ESPNcricinfo IPL team of the season.

The Sunrisers Hyderabad announced parting their ways with Tom Moody who served as the head coach for seven seasons since the inception in 2013. The Sunrisers announced the 2019 Cricket World Cup winning coach, Trevor Bayliss, as the replacement for the 2020 season. The Sunrisers also replaced Simon Helmot with Brad Haddin as their assistant coach.

Notes

Footnotes

References

External links
Sunrisers Hyderabad official website

2019 Indian Premier League
Sunrisers Hyderabad seasons